All Saints' Church, Edmonton, is located in Church Street Edmonton, London, England. First recorded in the 12th century, it was entirely rebuilt in the 15th century and has undergone many modifications since.

History 
All Saints is the parish church of Edmonton, formerly in the county of Middlesex and now in the London Borough of Enfield.

The earliest known reference to the existence of the church  comes in a document dating to some time between 1136 and 1142, which records it being given to Walden Abbey by Geoffrey de Mandeville. It was completely rebuilt in the 15th century, and has undergone many significant alterations since. In 1772 the exterior was clad in brick and all the tracery, except that of the chancel, was replaced with wooden window frames. William Robinson, an early 19th-century historian of Edmonton, attributed the nature of the work to the fact that one of the churchwardens was a bricklayer, and the other a carpenter. When Robinson described the church, it had only one aisle, on the north side of the nave.

The church's rector in 1772, Dawson Warren, regretted the architectural changes, and described them in verse:

The chancel  was restored by  Ewan Christian in 1855 and  the 18th-century wooden tracery was replaced in stone in 1868. In an extensive refurnishing of 1871 the galleries, added in the late 18th century were removed, and the box pews replaced. In 1889 a south aisle and an organ chamber were added to designs by Ewan Christian's former assistant  WG Scott. Inside, the nave roof and north arcade also date from the 15th century, while the south arcade dates from the alterations of 1889.

Notable burials 
 Charles Lamb, essayist.
 Mary Lamb, writer and sister of Charles Lamb.
 Tryphosa Jane Wallis, actress

References

External links 
(fn57) British History online

Edmonton
15th-century church buildings in England
Diocese of London
Edmonton, London
Grade II* listed churches in London
Grade II* listed buildings in the London Borough of Enfield
History of the London Borough of Enfield